Tunnel of Love is the fourth EP by American hip hop group Insane Clown Posse, released on April 19, 1996, by Psychopathic Records. It is the third and final "sideshow" entry in the group's Dark Carnival saga.

Background 

Unsatisfied with their contract with Jive Records, Insane Clown Posse's manager, Alex Abbiss, set up a deal which would sign the group with Hollywood Records. After their Jive contract expired, ICP had two days on their own before officially being signed to Hollywood, so they decided to record and release an EP independently on Psychopathic Records.

The EP consisted of "love songs" performed in the duo's trademark style.  Like The Terror Wheel, there is a hidden track at the end which contains a phone number, which could be called to reveal the name of the next Joker's Card, The Great Milenko.

Release and reception 

To promote the EP, Psychopathic sent out a pink Tunnel of Love van with flowers on it. However, this promotional tactic proved to be incomprehensible to many people, who did not understand what the van was promoting, and onlookers yelled homophobic insults at the drivers. After much disagreement between the heads of Psychopathic Records, label don Billy Bill pulled the van over and removed the wrapping promoting the EP.

The album was released in an alternate version with a pornographic album cover, and a bonus track, "Mental Warp". The cover was derived from a pornographic film VHS cover which depicted an actor with an erect penis standing next to two women, one of which is holding the erection in her hands. The actor's face was replaced by Shaggy 2 Dope's. Because no stores would stock the album with this cover and it was sold mostly at Insane Clown Posse's concerts, this edition became rare and sought after by fans.

Allmusic did not review the album, but gave it 3 out of 5 stars. "Mental Warp", the bonus track from the XXX edition of the album, also appeared on the compilation Forgotten Freshness Volumes 1 & 2. The songs "Cotton Candy" and "Super Balls" appeared in the film Big Money Hustlas. The song "Super Balls" originated the Juggalo slang "Whoop whoop!", which is used as a greeting among fans. The greeting and the song were also referenced in Twiztid's song "Meat Cleaver", which appeared on their 1997 debut Mostasteless. The pornographic alternate cover is discussed in the film Shockumentary by parents concerned about ICP's music.

Track listing

Personnel
 Violent J – vocals
 Shaggy 2 Dope – vocals, turntables
 Legz Diamond – guest vocals
 Mike E. Clark – turntables, production

References

1996 EPs
Albums produced by Mike E. Clark
Self-released EPs
Insane Clown Posse EPs
Psychopathic Records EPs